Pterostylis praetermissa, commonly known as the Mount Kaputar rustyhood is a plant in the orchid family Orchidaceae and is endemic to New South Wales. It has a rosette of leaves and up to nine relatively small greenish and reddish-brown flowers with transparent "windows" and a reddish-brown, insect-like labellum.

Description
Pterostylis praetermissa is a terrestrial,  perennial, deciduous, herb with an underground tuber. There are between two and five stem leaves with their bases loosely wrapped around the flowering stem. The "head" end has many short hairs and there are between twelve and fifteen longer hairs on each side of the body. Flowering occurs from September to October.

Taxonomy and naming
Pterostylis praetermissa was first formally described in 1989 by David Jones and Mark Clements from a specimen collected from near the Mount Kaputar National Park and published the description in Australian Orchid Research. The specific epithet (praetermissa) is derived from the Latin words praeter meaning "beyond", "past" or "more than" and missus meaning "sent".

Distribution and habitat
The Mount Kaputar rustyhood occurs in isolated populations on forest slopes and rocky ridges between Mount Kaputar and Barrington Tops.

References

External links 

praetermissa
Endemic orchids of Australia
Orchids of New South Wales
Plants described in 1989